C.I.D. 909 is a 1967 Bollywood film starring Feroz Khan & Mumtaz in lead roles. O. P. Nayyar has composed the music for the film.

Plot
A professor has developed a unique formula that can be both- constructive and destructive- which he intends to present in an international conference  for world peace. Vasco steals the formula but realizes that it is in code language and can only be decoded either by Professor or his daughter Reshma.

Then a series of kidnap and chase begins.

Cast
 Feroz Khan as Raju / C.I.D. 909
 Mumtaz as Reshma
 Helen as Sophia
 Bela Bose as Rosy
 Tun Tun as Julie Fernandes D'Silva Ghobewali, Reshma's governess
 Moolchand as Suraj
 MB Shetty as Shetty
 Rajan Haksar as Wong
 Brahm Bharadwaj as Professor
 Paro Devi as Paro, Professor's wife
 Mohan Sherry as Vasco/X-117
 Rajan Kapoor as Vasco's right-hand man
 Uma Dutt as CID Chief
 Ram Mohan as X-113
 Jullian as driver Vijay of car BML-4015

Soundtrack

External links

References

1967 films
1960s Hindi-language films
Films scored by O. P. Nayyar